The red top williamsi (Pseudotropheus williamsi) is a species of cichlid endemic to Lake Malawi where it occurs in areas with rocky substrates usually at depths of less than .  This species can reach a length of  TL.  It can also be found in the aquarium trade. The specific name honours the Anglican missionary Joseph A . Williams who died by drowning in Lake Malawi in 1895, with Bishop Chauncy Maples, and who collected the type of the cichlid among others.

References

red top williamsi
red top williamsi
red top williamsi
Taxonomy articles created by Polbot